Alessandro Bacci (born 23 September 1995) is an Italian football player.

Club career
He is the product of Fiorentina youth teams. For 2013–14 season he joined Tuttocuoio (then in Serie C2) on loan and became the first-choice goalkeeper for the club. He made his Serie C debut for the club on 30 August 2014 in a game against Carrarese.

For the 2015–16 season, he joined Pisa on another loan. He was recalled from loan mid-season and was loaned to yet another Serie C club, Siena.

On 17 July 2016, he signed a two-year contract with Juve Stabia in Serie C. He served as backup with the team.

On 31 August 2018, he joined Serie B club Ascoli on a one-year deal. He made his debut in the second tier for Ascoli on 30 December 2018 in a game against Crotone.

On 5 July 2019, he signed with Serie C club Lecco for a term of one year with an additional one-year extension option.

References

External links
 

1995 births
Sportspeople from the Province of Pistoia
Footballers from Tuscany
Living people
Italian footballers
Association football goalkeepers
A.C. Tuttocuoio 1957 San Miniato players
Pisa S.C. players
A.C.N. Siena 1904 players
S.S. Juve Stabia players
Ascoli Calcio 1898 F.C. players
Calcio Lecco 1912 players
Serie B players
Serie C players